This list of the Mesozoic life of Utah contains the various prehistoric life-forms whose fossilized remains have been reported from within the US state of Utah and are between 252.17 and 66 million years of age.

A

 †Abrekopsis
 †Abrekopsis depresispirus – type locality for species
 †Abydosaurus – type locality for genus
 †Abydosaurus mcintoshi – type locality for species
 †Aclistochara
 †Aclistochara bransoni
  †Acristavus
 †Acristavus gagslarsoni
 †Adelodelphys
 †Adelodelphys muizoni
 †Adelolophus – type locality for genus
 †Adelolophus hutchisoni – type locality for species
 †Admetopsis
  †Adocus
 †Aenigmadelphys
 †Aenigmadelphys archeri – type locality for species
  †Alamosaurus
 †Alamosaurus sanjuanensis
  †Albanerpeton
 †Albanerpeton cifellii – type locality for species
 †Albanerpeton galaktion
 †Albanerpeton gracilis
 †Albanerpeton nexuosus
 †Aletridelphys
 †Aletridelphys hatcheri
  †Allocrioceras
 †Allocrioceras annulatum
  †Allosaurus
 †Allosaurus fragilis
  †Alphadon
 †Alphadon attaragos
 †Alphadon eatoni – type locality for species
 †Alphadon halleyi
 †Alphadon marshi – or unidentified comparable form
 †Alphadon sahnii
 †Alzadites
 †Alzadites incomptus
 †Amberleya – tentative report
 †Amblotherium
 †Amblotherium gracilis
 †Ameribaatar – type locality for genus
 †Ameribaatar zofiae – type locality for species
 †Ameribataar
 †Ameribataar zofiae
 Amia
 †Ampezzopleura
 †Ampezzopleura rugosa – type locality for species
 †Amplovalvata
 †Anaflemingites
 †Anaflemingites silberlingi – or unidentified related form
 †Anasibirites
 †Anasibirites angulosus
 †Anasibirites bastini
 †Anasibirites hircinus
 †Anasibirites kingianus
 †Anasibirites mojsisovicsi
 †Anasibirites multiformis
 †Anasibirites tenuistriatus
 †Anawasatchites
 †Anchisauripus
 †Anchisauripus sillimani
 †Anchistodelphys – type locality for genus
 †Anchistodelphys archibaldi – type locality for species
 †Anchistodelphys delicatus – type locality for species
 †Anchura
 †Anemia
 †Anemia dakotensis
 †Anemia dicksoniana
 †Anemia fremontii
  †Animantarx – type locality for genus
 †Animantarx ramaljonesi – type locality for species
 †Anisomyon
 Anomia
  †Anomoepus
 †Apatopus
 †Apatopus lineatus
  †Apatosaurus
 †Apatosaurus louisae – type locality for species
 †Apistodon – report made of unidentified related form or using admittedly obsolete nomenclature
 †Apistodon exiguus – or unidentified related form
 †Aquiladelphis – tentative report
 †Aquiladelphis laurae – type locality for species
 †Araeodon
 †Araeodon intermissus
 †Araucariacites
 †Araucariacites australis
 †Araucariacites fissus
  †Araucarioxylon
 †Arcomya
 †Arctoceras
 †Arctoceras tuberculatum
 †Arctoprionites
 †Arctoprionites resseri
 †Arvinachelys – type locality for genus
 †Arvinachelys goldeni – type locality for species
 †Aspenites
 †Aspenites acutus
 Astarte
 †Astarte livingstonensis
 †Astarte meeki
  Asteriacites
 †Asteriacites lumbricalis
 †Astralopteris
 †Astralopteris coloradica
 †Astroconodon
 †Astroconodon delicatus – type locality for species
 †Atreipus
 †Atreipus milfordensis
  †Aublysodon – tentative report
 †Aucellina
 †Austrotindaria
 †Austrotindaria canalensis
 †Austrotindaria svalbardensis
 †Avitotherium – type locality for genus
 †Avitotherium utahensis – type locality for species

B

 †Baena
 †Baibisha – or unidentified comparable form
 †Bajarunia
 †Bajarunia confusionensis – type locality for species
 †Bakevellia
 †Bakevellia costata
 †Bakevellia costatus – or unidentified comparable form
 †Bakevellia exporrecta
 †Bakevellia silberlingi – type locality for species
  †Barosaurus
 †Barosaurus lentus
  †Basilemys
 †Batrachopus
 †Battenizyga
 †Battenizyga eotriassica – type locality for species
 †Bernissartia
 †Bicuspidon – type locality for genus
 †Bicuspidon numerosus – type locality for species
 †Bicuspidon smikros – type locality for species
 †Borissiakoceras
 †Bothriagenys – type locality for genus
 †Bothriagenys mysterion – type locality for species
  †Brachauchenius
 †Brachauchenius lucasi
  †Brachiosaurus
 †Brachychirotherium
 †Brachychirotherium thuringiacum
 †Brachyphyllum
 †Brachyphyllum crassicaule
 †Brasilichnium
  †Brontomerus – type locality for genus
 †Brontomerus mcintoshi – type locality for species
 †Brontopodus
  †Brontosaurus
 †Brontosaurus parvus
 †Brownichnus
 †Brownichnus favosites – type locality for species
 †Bryceomys
 †Bryceomys fumosus – type locality for species
 †Bryceomys hadrosus
 †Bryceomys intermedius – type locality for species

C

 †Callialasporites
 †Callialasporites segmentatus
 †Callialasporites turbatus
 Callistina
 †Callistina alta – or unidentified related form
  †Calycoceras
 †Calycoceras naviculare
  †Camarasaurus – type locality for genus
 †Camarasaurus lentus – type locality for species
 Campeloma
 †Camptonectes
 †Camptonectes platessiformis
 †Camptonectes stygius
  †Camptosaurus
 †Camptosaurus dispar
 †Cantioscyllium – or unidentified comparable form
 †Carmelopodus – type locality for genus
 †Carmelopodus untermannorum – type locality for species
 †Carycorbula
 †Carycorbula nematophora
 †Cassiope
 †Cassiope utahensis
 †Cedaromys
 †Cedaromys bestia – type locality for species
 †Cedaromys hutchisoni – or unidentified comparable form
 †Cedaromys minimus – type locality for species
 †Cedaromys parvus – type locality for species
 †Cedarosaurus – type locality for genus
 †Cedarosaurus weiskopfae – type locality for species
 †Cedarpelta – type locality for genus
 †Cedarpelta bilbeyhallorum – type locality for species
  †Cedrorestes – type locality for genus
 †Cedrorestes crichtoni – type locality for species
 †Cedroxylon
  †Ceratodus
  †Ceratosaurus
 †Ceratosaurus nasicornis
 †Cercomya
 †Cercomya punctata
 †Cerebropollenites
 †Cerebropollenites macroverruesus
 Cerithiopsis
 †Chamops
 †Chamops segnis
 †Characichnos
 †Chartronella
 †Chartronella pagina – type locality for species
 †Chartronella unicostata – type locality for species
  †Chinlea – type locality for genus
 †Chinlea sorenseni – type locality for species
  †Chirotherium
 †Chirotherium rex – or unidentified comparable form
 Chlamys
  †Chondrites
 †Churkites
 †Churkites noblei
 †Cimexomys
 †Cimexomys antiquus – or unidentified comparable form
 †Cimexomys gregoryi – type locality for species
 †Cimolodon
 †Cimolodon electus
 †Cimolodon nitidus – or unidentified comparable form
 †Cimolodon similis
 †Cimolodon wardi – type locality for species
  †Cimolomys
 †Cimolomys clarki
 †Cimolomys milliensis – type locality for species
 †Cionichthys – type locality for genus
 †Cionichthys dunklei – type locality for species
  Cladophlebis
 †Cladophlebis constricta
 †Cladophlebis parva
 †Claraia
 †Cnodontosaurus – type locality for genus
 †Cnodontosaurus suchockii – type locality for species
  †Coelophysis – tentative report
 †Coelostylina
 †Coelostylina angulifera – or unidentified comparable form
 †Coelostylina costata – type locality for species
 †Coelostylina virginensis – type locality for species
  †Coelurus
 †Coelurus fragilis
 †Compsemys
 †Confusionella
 †Confusionella loczyi
  †Coniophis
 †Coniopteris
 †Coniopteris hymenophylloides
 †Contogenys
 †Contogenys sloani – or unidentified comparable form
 Corbula
 †Cordillerites
 †Cordillerites compressus
 †Corviconodon
 †Corviconodon utahensis – type locality for species
 Cossmannea
 †Cossmannea imayi
 †Cossmannea imlayi
 †Cossmannea kanabensis
 †Costatoria
 †Cowboyiceras – type locality for genus
 †Cowboyiceras farwestense – type locality for species
 †Cretorectolobus
 †Crittendenia
 †Ctenacodon
 †Cteniogenys
 †Ctenostreon
 †Ctenostreon gikshanensis – or unidentified comparable form
  Cucullaea
 †Cucullaea haguei
 †Culicolestes – type locality for genus
 †Culicolestes kielanae – type locality for species
  †Cycadeoidea
 †Cycadeoidea cleavelandii
 †Cycadeoidea medullara
 Cylichna
 †Cylindrobullina
 †Cylindrobullina convexa – type locality for species
 †Cymbophora
 †Cynepteris
 †Cynepteris lasiophora
 †Cypellospongia – type locality for genus
 †Cypellospongia fimbriartis – type locality for species
 †Czekanowskia
 †Czekanowskia turneri – type locality for species

D

 †Dakotadens – type locality for genus
 †Dakotadens morrowi – type locality for species
 †Dakotadens pertritus – type locality for species
 †Dakotamys
 †Dakotamys malcolmi – type locality for species
 †Dakotaseps – type locality for genus
 †Dakotaseps gillettorum – type locality for species
 †Dakotasuchus
 †Dakotasuchus kingi
  †Deinonychus
 †Denazinemys
 †Denazinemys nodosa
 Dentalium
 †Dentalium sublineatum – or unidentified related form
  †Diabloceratops – type locality for genus
 †Diabloceratops eatoni – type locality for species
 †Dicothodon – type locality for genus
 †Dicothodon cifelli
 †Dicothodon cifellii – type locality for species
 †Dicothodon moorensis – type locality for species
 †Dieneroceras
 †Dieneroceras dieneri
 †Dimekodontosaurus – type locality for genus
 †Dimekodontosaurus madseni – type locality for species
 †Dinehichnus – type locality for genus
 †Dinehichnus socialis – type locality for species
 †Dinochelys – type locality for genus
 †Dinochelys whitei – type locality for species
 †Dinophyton
 †Dinophyton spinosus
 †Dinosauropodes – type locality for genus
 †Dinosauropodes bransfordii
 †Dinosauropodes magrawii – type locality for species
 †Dinosauropodes osborni
 †Dinosauropodes wilsoni
 †Diplochilus – tentative report
  †Diplodocus
 †Diplodocus hallorum
 †Diplodocus longus
  Discinisca – report made of unidentified related form or using admittedly obsolete nomenclature
 †Docodon
  †Dolichorhynchops
 †Dolichorhynchops tropicensis – type locality for species
  †Doswellia
 †Drepanocheilus
 †Drepanocheilus ruidium
 †Dryolestes
 †Dryolestes priscus
 †Dryosaurus
 †Dryosaurus altus
 †Dystrophaeus – type locality for genus
 †Dystrophaeus viaemalae – type locality for species

E

 †Elegantinia
 Elliptio
  †Enchodus
 †Enneabatrachus
 †Entalophora
 †Entalophora stokesi
 †Entolioides
 †Entolium
 †Entradasuchus – type locality for genus
 †Entradasuchus spinosus – type locality for species
 †Eoalphadon
 †Eoalphadon clemensi – type locality for species
 †Eoalphadon lillegraveni – type locality for species
 †Eoalphadon woodburnei – type locality for species
 †Eocephalites
 †Eocephalites primus
  †Eodelphis
 †Eoginkgoites
  †Eolambia – type locality for genus
 †Eolambia caroljonesa – type locality for species
 †Eopolycotylus – type locality for genus
 †Eopolycotylus rankini – type locality for species
 †Equisetites
  †Equisetum
 †Equisetum burchardtii
 †Equisetum UD006 – informal
 †Eryma
 †Eryma jungostrix
 †Eucalyptus
 †Eucalyptus dakotensis
 †Eumorphotis
 †Eumorphotis beneckei – or unidentified comparable form
 †Eumorphotis ericius – type locality for species
 †Eumorphotis hinnitidea
 †Eumorphotis multiformis
 †Eumorphotis venetiana
 †Eumorphotis virginensis – type locality for species
 †Eunaticina
 †Eunaticina textilis
 †Euomphaloceras
 †Euspira
 †Euspira concinna
 †Euthlastus
 †Euthlastus cordiformis
 †Eutretauranosuchus
 †Evazoum
 †Exesipollenites
 †Exesipollenites tumulosus
  †Exogyra
 †Exogyra acroumbonata
 †Exogyra levis
 †Exostinus – or unidentified comparable form

F

 †Fabrosaurus – tentative report
  †Falcarius – type locality for genus
 †Falcarius utahensis – type locality for species
 Ficus
 †Ficus daphnogenoides
 †Flemingites
 †Frenelopsis
 †Frenelopsis varians
 †Frenelopsis variens

G

  †Gastonia – type locality for genus
 †Gastonia burgei – type locality for species
 †Geltena
 †Geminiraptor
 †Geminiraptor suarezarum
 †Germanonautilus – tentative report
 †Gervillaria
 †Gervillaria montanaensis
 †Gervillia
 Gleichenia
 †Gleichenia comptoniaefolia
 †Gleichenia delicatula
 †Glirodon – type locality for genus
 †Glirodon grandis – type locality for species
 Globularia – tentative report
 †Glyptops
 †Glyptops plicatulus – type locality for species
 †Gondolella
 †Gondolella planata
 †Goniobasis – tentative report
 †Goniobasis subtortuosa
 †Goniodiscus
 †Goniodiscus smithi
 †Goniomya
 †Goniomya montanaensis
  †Goniopholis
  †Grallator
 †Grallator cursorius
 †Grammatodon
 †Grammatodon haguei
  †Gryphaea
 †Gryphaea planoconvexa
 †Gryphaeostrea
  †Gryposaurus
 †Gryposaurus monumentensis – type locality for species
 †Guodunites
 †Guodunites hooveri
 †Gwyneddichnium
 †Gypsonictops

H

  †Hagryphus – type locality for genus
 †Hagryphus giganteus – type locality for species
 †Hamulus – tentative report
 †Hamulus subquadratus
 †Hanielites
 †Harmodontosaurus – type locality for genus
 †Harmodontosaurus emeryensis – type locality for species
 †Hausmania
 †Hausmania rigida
 †Hedenstroemia
 †Hedenstroemia kossmati
 Hemiaster
 †Hemiaster humphreysanus
 †Hemicalypterus – type locality for genus
 †Hemicalypterus weiri – type locality for species
 †Heminajas – tentative report
 †Heminajas balatonis – or unidentified comparable form
 †Hemiprionites
 †Hemiprionites typus
  †Hippodraco – type locality for genus
 †Hippodraco scutodens – type locality for species
 †Hispanosauropus
 †Hoernesia
 †Holocrinus
 †Holocrinus dubius – tentative report
 †Holocrinus smithi
 †Homalopoma
 †Homalopoma sinbadensis – type locality for species
 †Homomya
 †Hoplitosaurus – or unidentified comparable form
  †Hoplosuchus – type locality for genus
 †Hoplosuchus kayi – type locality for species
  †Hybodus
 †Hyporosopora
 †Hyporosopora nielsoni – type locality for species

I

 †Icacinoxylon
 †Icacinoxylon pittiense – type locality for species
 †Idahocolumbites
 †Idahocolumbites cheneyi
   †Iguanacolossus – type locality for genus
 †Iguanacolossus fortis – type locality for species
 †Iguanodon
 †Iguanodon ottingeri – type locality for species
 Ilex
 †Ilex serrata
  †Inoceramus
 †Inoceramus albertensis – or unidentified comparable form
 †Inoceramus flavus
 †Inoceramus gilberti
 †Inoceramus koeneni
 †Inoceramus pictus
 †Inoceramus tenuistriatus – tentative report
 †Inoceramus undabundus
 †Inyoites
 †Inyoites beaverensis – type locality for species
 †Inyoites oweni
 †Iqualadelphis
 †Iqualadelphis lactea
 †Iridotriton – type locality for genus
 †Iridotriton hechti – type locality for species
 †Ischyrhiza – or unidentified comparable form
 Isocrinus
 †Isocrinus nicoleti
   Isognomon
 †Isognomon perplana – or unidentified comparable form
 †Iugomortiferum – type locality for genus
 †Iugomortiferum thoringtoni – type locality for species

J

 †Janumys – type locality for genus
 †Janumys erebos – type locality for species
 †Janumys erebros
 †Jeanbesseiceras
 †Jeanbesseiceras jacksoni
 †Jugulator
 †Jugulator amplissimus
 †Juvenites
 †Juvenites spathi – or unidentified related form
 †Juvenites thermarum – or unidentified comparable form

K

  †Kallirhynchia
 †Kallirhynchia myrina – type locality for species
 †Kamerunoceras
 †Kashmirites
 †Kashmirites confusionensis
 †Kashmirites meeki
 †Kashmirites nivalis
 †Kashmirites perrini
 †Kashmirites seerleyi
 †Kashmirites stepheni – type locality for species
 †Kashmirites subarmatus
 †Kashmirites utahensis – type locality for species
 †Kayentapus
 †Kokopellia – type locality for genus
 †Kokopellia juddi – type locality for species
 †Koparion – type locality for genus
 †Koparion douglassi – type locality for species
 †Koreanaornis
 †Koreanaornis hamanensis – or unidentified comparable form
  †Kosmoceratops – type locality for genus
 †Kosmoceratops richardsoni – type locality for species
  †Kouphichnium

L

 †Ladinaticella
 †Ladinaticella striatocostata
 †Lanceolites
 †Lanceolites bicarinatus
 †Lanceolites compactus
 †Lasalichthys – type locality for genus
 †Lasalichthys hillsi – type locality for species
 †Latochara
 †Latochara latitruncata
 †Laubopsis – tentative report
 †Legumen
  †Leidyosuchus
 †Lenticidaris – type locality for genus
 †Lenticidaris utahensis – type locality for species
  †Lepidotes
 †Lepidotes walcotti – type locality for species
  Lepisosteus
 †Leptalestes
 †Leptochamops
 †Leptochamops denticulatus
 †Leptochondria
 †Leptochondria curtocardinalis
 †Leptochondria nuetzeli – type locality for species
 †Leptochondria occidanea – type locality for species
 †Leptochondria xijinwulanensis
 Lima
 †Lingularia
 †Lingularia borealis
 †Liopistha
 †Liopistha meeki
 †Liostrea
 †Liostrea strigilecula
 †Liriophyllum
 †Liriophyllum UD012 – informal
  †Lissodus
 †Litakis
 †Litakis gilmorei
 †Lonchidion
  Lopha
 †Lopha engelmanni – or unidentified related form
 Lucina
 †Lyosoma
 †Lyosoma enoda
 †Lyosoma powelli
  †Lythronax – type locality for genus
 †Lythronax argestes – type locality for species

M

  †Machairoceratops – type locality for genus
 †Machairoceratops cronusi – type locality for species
  †Macroelongatoolithus
 †Macroelongatoolithus carlylei – type locality for species
 †Mactromya – tentative report
 †Magadiceramus
 †Magadiceramus crenelatus
 †Magadiceramus crenistriatus
 †Magadiceramus soukupi
  Magnolia
 †Magnolia boulayana
  †Mammites
 †Mammites nodosoides
  †Marshosaurus – type locality for genus
 †Marshosaurus bicentesimus – type locality for species
 †Martharaptor – type locality for genus
 †Martharaptor greenriverensis – type locality for species
 †Matonidium
 †Matonidium brownii
 †Matonidium lancipinnulum
 †Meekoceras
 †Meekoceras davisi
 †Meekoceras gracilitatis
 †Meekoceras millardense – type locality for species
 †Meekoceras olivieri – type locality for species
 †Megalosauripus
 †Megasphaeroceras
 †Megasphaeroceras rotundum – or unidentified comparable form
 †Melvius
 †Melvius chauliodous – or unidentified comparable form
  †Meniscoessus
 †Meniscoessus intermedius
 †Meniscognathus
 †Meniscognathus altmani – or unidentified comparable form
 †Meniscognathus molybrochoros – type locality for species
 †Mesembrioxylon
 †Mesembrioxylon stokesi
 †Mesembrioxylon stokesii
 †Mesembryoxylon
 †Mesodma
 †Mesodma formosa – or unidentified comparable form
 †Mesodma hensleighi – or unidentified comparable form
 †Mesodma minor – or unidentified comparable form
 †Mesodma thompsoni – or unidentified comparable form
 †Mesostoma
 †Metoicoceras
 †Metoicoceras geslinianum
 †Microcachrydites
 †Microconchus
 †Microconchus utahensis
 †Microeciella
 †Microeciella duoflavina
 †Microeciella pollostos – type locality for species
 †Minersvillites – type locality for genus
 †Minersvillites farai – type locality for species
 †Miocidaris
 †Miocidaris utahensis
  †Moabosaurus – type locality for genus
 †Moabosaurus utahensis – type locality for species
 Modiolus
 †Modiolus isonemus
 †Modiolus subimbricatus
 †Monanthesia
 †Monocnemodon – type locality for genus
 †Monocnemodon syphakos – type locality for species
 †Moros – type locality for genus
 †Moros intrepidus – type locality for species
 †Myalina
 †Myledaphus
 †Myledaphus bipartitus
 †Myoconcha
 †Myoconcha plana – or unidentified comparable form
 †Myopholas
 †Myopholas hardyi
  †Myophorella
 †Myophorella livinigstonensis
 †Myophorella monatanaensis
 †Myophorella yellowstonensis
  †Myophoria
 †Mytiloides
 †Mytiloides submytiloides – or unidentified related form
  †Mytilus
 †Mytilus whitei – or unidentified comparable form

N

 †Naomichelys
  †Nasutoceratops – type locality for genus
 †Nasutoceratops titusi – type locality for species
 †Naticopsis
 †Naticopsis depressispira
 †Naticopsis fenestravella – type locality for species
 †Naticopsis utahensis – type locality for species
 †Natiria
 †Natiria aequicostata – type locality for species
 †Natiria costata – or unidentified comparable form
 †Nedcolbertia – type locality for genus
 †Nedcolbertia justinhoffmanni – type locality for species
 †Nemodon
 †Neocardioceras
 †Neocardioceras juddii
 †Neocrioceras
 †Neoschizodus
 †Neoschizodus laevigatus
 †Neoschizodus orbicularis – or unidentified comparable form
 †Neoschizodus praeorbicularis
 †Neoschizodus thaynesianus – type locality for species
 †Neridomus – tentative report
  †Nerinea – tentative report
 †Neritaria
 †Neritaria costata – type locality for species
  Neritina
 †Neritina phaseolaris
 †Neurankylus
 †Nezpercius
 †Nezpercius dodsoni
 †Nilsonia
 †Nilsonia lewisii – type locality for species
 †Nilssoniopteris
 †Nododelphinula – tentative report
  †Normannites – tentative report
 †Normannites crickmayi – or unidentified related form
  †Nothronychus
 †Nothronychus graffami – type locality for species
 Nucula
 Nuculana
 †Nuculana mutuata – or unidentified comparable form
 †Nymphalucina
 †Nymphalucina linearia – or unidentified related form

O

 †Obnixia – type locality for genus
 †Obnixia thaynesiana
 †Odaxosaurus
 †Odaxosaurus piger – or unidentified comparable form
 †Odaxosaurus priscus
 †Odaxosaurus roosevelti – type locality for species
 †Omphaloptycha
 †Omphaloptycha hormolira – type locality for species
 †Omphaloptychia
 †Omphaloptychia laevisphaera – type locality for species
 Oncousoecia – tentative report
 †Ooliticia – tentative report
 †Ophioglypha
 †Ophioglypha utahensis – type locality for species
 †Opisthias
  †Ornithomimus
 †Osteocallis
 †Osteocallis mandibulus
 Ostrea
 †Ostrea occidentalis
 †Ostrea strigulecula
  †Othnielosaurus
 †Othnielosaurus consors
  †Otozoum
 †Ovaloolithus
 †Ovaloolithus tenuisus – type locality for species
 †Ovaloolithus utahensis – type locality for species
 †Owenites
 †Owenites carpenteri
 †Owenites koeneni

P

 †Pachyomphalus
 †Pachyomphalus americanus – type locality for species
  †Pagiophyllum
 †Paiutemys – type locality for genus
 †Paiutemys tibert – type locality for species
 †Palaeophycus – or unidentified comparable form
 †Palaeopiceoxylon
 †Palaeopiceoxylon thinosu
 †Palaeopiceoxylon thinosus
 †Palaeoscincosaurus
 †Palaeoscincosaurus pharkidodon – type locality for species
 †Paleoaster
 †Paleoaster inquirenda
 †Palmulasaurus – type locality for genus
 †Palmulasaurus quadratus – type locality for species
 †Parachondroceras
 †Parachondroceras andrewsi
 †Parachondroceras filicostatum – or unidentified comparable form
 †Paracimexomys
 †Paracimexomys judithae – or unidentified comparable form
 †Paracimexomys magnus
 †Paracimexomys perplexus – type locality for species
 †Paracimexomys priscus – or unidentified comparable form
 †Paracimexomys robisoni – type locality for species
 †Paraglyphanodon – type locality for genus
 †Paraglyphanodon gazini – type locality for species
 †Paraglyphanodon utahensis – type locality for species
 †Parallelodon – tentative report
 †Parallelodon beyrichii – or unidentified related form
 †Paramacellodus
 †Paramacellodus oweni – or unidentified comparable form
 †Paranyctoides
 †Paraphyllanthoxylon
 †Paraphyllanthoxylon utahense
 †Parasaniwa
 †Parasaniwa cynochoros – type locality for species
 †Parasaniwa wyomingensis – or unidentified comparable form
   †Parasaurolophus
 †Parasaurolophus cyrtocristatus
 †Pariadens
 †Pariadens kirklandi – type locality for species
 †Pariadens mckennai – type locality for species
 †Parmicorbula
  †Paronychodon – or unidentified comparable form
  †Parotosuchus
 †Parotosuchus nov. spec. – informal
 †Parussuria
 †Parussuria compressa
 †Patulopora
 †Patulopora cutleri
 †Paullia
 †Pediomys – report made of unidentified related form or using admittedly obsolete nomenclature
 †Pegmavalvula
 †Pegmavalvula triassica
 †Pelecypodichnus
 †Peloroplites – type locality for genus
 †Peloroplites cedrimontanus – type locality for species
 †Peneteius – type locality for genus
 †Peneteius saueri – type locality for species
 †Pentasauropus
 †Periallus
 †Periallus woodsidensis
 †Perissoptera
 †Permophorus
 †Permophorus bregeri – or unidentified comparable form
 †Permophorus triassicus
 †Pernopecten
 †Phelopteria
 †Phelopteria minuta – or unidentified comparable form
 †Phlebopteris
  Pholadomya
 †Pholadomya inaequiplicata
 †Pholadomya kingi
 †Piarorhynchella
 †Piarorhynchella triassica
 †Piarorhynchella triassicus
 †Picopsis
 †Pinacosuchus – type locality for genus
 †Pinacosuchus mantiensis – type locality for species
 Pinna
 †Pinna kingi
  †Pistia – report made of unidentified related form or using admittedly obsolete nomenclature
 †Pistia corrugata
 †Pityoxylon
  †Placenticeras
 †Placenticeras cumminsi
 Placopsilina
 †Plagioglypta
 †Plagiostoma
 †Plagiostoma occidentalis
 †Plagiostoma ziona
 †Planicoxa – type locality for genus
 †Planicoxa venenica – type locality for species
  †Planolites
 †Plataninium
 †Plesiopinna
 †Pleuromya
 †Pleuromya musculoides – or unidentified comparable form
 †Pleuromya prima – type locality for species
 †Pleuromya subcompressa
  †Pleuronautilus
 †Pleuronectites
  Pleurotomaria – tentative report
 Plicatula
 †Plicatula ferryi – or unidentified comparable form
 †Podozamites
 †Polyacrodus – tentative report
 †Polyglyphanodon – type locality for genus
 †Polyglyphanodon sternbergi – type locality for species
 †Polygyrina
  †Poposaurus
 †Poposaurus gracilis
 †Preflorianites
 †Preflorianites toulai
 †Preprismatoolithus
 †Preprismatoolithus coloradensis
 †Priacodon
 †Primaderma – type locality for genus
 †Primaderma nessovi – type locality for species
 †Prismatoolithus
 †Prismatoolithus jenseni – type locality for species
 †Procerithium – tentative report
 †Promathildia
 †Promathildia spirocostata – type locality for species
 †Promyalina
 †Promyalina putiatinensis
 †Promyalina spathi
 †Promysidiella
 †Pronoella
 †Pronoella cinnabarensis – or unidentified comparable form
 †Pronoella uintahensis
 †Proplacenticeras
 †Proplacenticeras stantoni
 †Prorokia
 †Prorokia fontenellensis
 †Protalphadon
 †Protocardia
 †Protogusarella
 †Protogusarella smithi
 †Protopis
 †Protopis waageni – or unidentified related form
 †Protovirgularia
 †Psalandon – tentative report
 †Pseudaspidoceras
 †Pseudocalycoceras
 †Pseudocorbula
 †Pseudohypolophus
  †Pseudomelania
 †Pseudomyoconcha – tentative report
 †Pseudoptera
 †Pseudosageceras
 †Pseudosageceras multilobatum
 †Pseudosaurillus – or unidentified comparable form
 †Pseudotetrasauropus
 †Pseudotritonium
 †Pseudotritonium sciaphosterum – type locality for species
 †Psilomya
 †Psilomya concentrica – or unidentified related form
 †Psilomya elongata – or unidentified related form
 †Pteraichnus
 †Pteraichnus saltwashensis – or unidentified comparable form
 †Pteraichnus stokesi – or unidentified comparable form
 †Ptychotrigon
  Pycnodonte
 †Pycnodonte newberryi

Q

 †Quenstedtia
 †Quenstedtia bathonica – or unidentified related form

R

 †Radioceras
 †Radioceras evolvens – or unidentified related form
  †Redondasaurus
 †Redondasaurus gregorii
 Rhabdocolpus
 †Rhabdocolpus viriosus
 †Rhadinosteus – type locality for genus
 †Rhadinosteus parvus – type locality for species
 †Rhynchonella – report made of unidentified related form or using admittedly obsolete nomenclature
 †Rhynchosauroides
 †Rhynchosauroides schochardti
 †Rhynchostreon
 †Rhynchostreon levis
  †Richardoestesia
 †Richardoestesia isosceles – or unidentified comparable form
 Rogerella
 †Rotodactylus
 †Rotodactylus cursorius – type locality for species

S

 †Sabalites
 †Sabalites NE008 – informal
 Salix
 †Salix newberryana
  †Sauropelta – or unidentified comparable form
 †Scapherpeton
 †Schillerosaurus – type locality for genus
 †Schillerosaurus utahensis – type locality for species
 †Sciponoceras
 †Sciponoceras gracile
 †Scotiophryne
 †Scotiophryne pustulosa
 †Scoyenia
  †Seitaad – type locality for genus
 †Seitaad ruessi – type locality for species
 †Sementiconcha – type locality for genus
 †Sementiconcha recuperator – type locality for species
  †Semionotus
 †Semionotus kanabensis – type locality for species
 Serpula
 †Serpula intrica
 †Serpula large
 †Sexta
 †Sexta navicula – or unidentified related form
  †Siats – type locality for genus
 †Siats meekerorum – type locality for species
 †Simplicidium
 †Sinbadelphys
 †Sinbadelphys schmidti
 †Sinbadiella – type locality for genus
 †Sinbadiella pygmaea – type locality for species
  †Skolithos
 †Sohlites
 †Sohlites spinosus
  Solemya
 †Solemya obscura
 †Soleniscus
 †Spalacolestes
 †Spalacolestes cretulablatta
 †Spalacolestes inconcinnus – type locality for species
 †Spalacotheridium – type locality for genus
 †Spalacotheridium mckennai – type locality for species
 †Spalacotheridium noblei
  †Spheroolithus
 †Spheruprismatoolithus – type locality for genus
 †Spheruprismatoolithus condensis
 †Spheruprismatoolithus condensus – type locality for species
 Spirorbis – report made of unidentified related form or using admittedly obsolete nomenclature
 †Spirorbis valvata – or unidentified comparable form
 †Spongioolithus – type locality for genus
 †Spongioolithus hirschi – type locality for species
 †Squatirhina
 †Squatirhina americana
  †Stagonolepis
 †Stegopodus – type locality for genus
 †Stegopodus czerkasi – type locality for species
  †Stegosaurus
 †Stegosaurus stenops – or unidentified comparable form
 †Stegosaurus ungulatus
 †Stellatochara
 †Stellatochara obovata
 †Stemmatoceras
 †Stemmatoceras albertense – or unidentified related form
 †Stemmatoceras arcicostum
  †Stephanoceras
 †Stephanoceras nodosum – or unidentified related form
  †Stokesosaurus – type locality for genus
 †Stokesosaurus clevelandi – type locality for species
 Stomatopora
 †Stomohamites
 †Strobeus
 †Strobeus batteni
 †Submeekoceras
 †Submeekoceras mushbachanum
 †Symmetrocapulus – tentative report
 †Symmetrocapulus corrugatus
 †Symmetrodontoides
 †Symmetrodontoides foxi – type locality for species
 †Symmetrodontoides oligodontos – type locality for species
 †Syncyclonema
 †Synorichthys
 †Synorichthys stewarti

T

  †Talos – type locality for genus
 †Talos sampsoni – type locality for species
 †Tancredia – tentative report
  †Tanycolagreus
 †Tanycolagreus topwilsoni
 †Teinostomopsis – tentative report
  †Tempskya
 †Tempskya jonesii – type locality for species
 †Tempskya knowltoni
 †Tempskya minor
 †Tempskya superba
 †Tempskya whiteheadi – type locality for species
  †Tenontosaurus
  †Teratophoneus – type locality for genus
 †Teratophoneus curriei – type locality for species
 Teredolites
 †Teredolites clavatus
 †Tethyaster
 †Tethyaster jurassicus – type locality for species
 †Tetrasauropus
 †Thalassinoides
 †Therangopodus – tentative report
 †Therangospodus – type locality for genus
 †Therangospodus pandemicus – type locality for species
 †Theretairus
 †Thescelus
 †Thescelus insiliens
 Thracia
 †Thracia weedi
 †Tirolites
 †Tirolites carniolicus – tentative report
 †Tirolites smithi – or unidentified related form
  †Torvosaurus
 †Toxolophosaurus – or unidentified comparable form
 †Trachodon
  †Torosaurus
 †Torosaurus utahensis
 †Triconolestes – type locality for genus
 †Triconolestes curvicuspis – type locality for species
 †Trigonia
 †Trigonia americana
 †Trigonia elegantissima
 †Trigonia montanaensis
 †Trigonodus
 †Trigonodus orientalis – or unidentified comparable form
 †Trigonodus sandbergeri – or unidentified comparable form
 †Trigonodus sandbergi – or unidentified comparable form
  †Trinacromerum
 †Trinacromerum bentonianum – tentative report
 †Tripennaculus – type locality for genus
 †Tripennaculus eatoni – type locality for species
 †Trisauropodiscus
 †Trisauropodiscus moabensis – type locality for species
 Trochocyathus
 †Trochosmilia
 †Trochosmilia moorei – type locality for species
 †Tulotomops
 †Tulotomops laevibasalis
 †Turgidodon – type locality for genus
 †Turgidodon lillegraveni – type locality for species
 †Turgidodon madseni – type locality for species
 †Turgidodon russelli – or unidentified comparable form
 Turritella
 †Turritella whitei
 †Tylostoma – tentative report
  †Tyrannosauripus – type locality for genus
 †Tyrannosauripus petersoni – type locality for species

U

 †Undichnia
 †Unicardium
 †Unionites
 †Unionites borealis – or unidentified comparable form
 †Unionites fassaensis
 †Ussurites
 †Ussurites hosei
  †Utahceratops – type locality for genus
 †Utahceratops gettyi – type locality for species
 †Utahgenys – type locality for genus
 †Utahgenys antongai – type locality for species
 †Utahgenys evansi – type locality for species
  †Utahraptor – type locality for genus
 †Utahraptor ostrommaysi – type locality for species
  †Uteodon
 †Uteodon aphanoecetes

V

  Valvata
  †Vancleavea
 †Vancleavea campi
 †Varalphadon – type locality for genus
 †Varalphadon crebreforme – type locality for species
 †Varalphadon wahweapensis – type locality for species
 †Vaugonia
 †Vaugonia conradi
 †Vaugonia utahensis
 †Venenosaurus – type locality for genus
 †Venenosaurus dicrocei – type locality for species
 †Vercherites
 †Vercherites undulatus – type locality for species
 †Vex
  Viviparus

W

 †Wailiceras
 †Wailiceras aemulus – or unidentified comparable form
 †Wasatchites
 †Wasatchites perrini
 †Webbsaurus – type locality for genus
 †Webbsaurus lofgreni – type locality for species
 †Worthenia
 †Worthenia windowblindensis – type locality for species
 †Wortheniella
 †Wortheniella canalifera – or unidentified comparable form
 †Worthoceras
 †Wyomingites
 †Wyomingites aplanatus – or unidentified comparable form

X

 †Xenoceltites
 †Xenoceltites cordilleranus
 †Xenoceltites subevolutus
 †Xiaoqiaoceras – tentative report
 †Xiaoqiaoceras americanum – type locality for species

Y

  †Yurgovuchia – type locality for genus
 †Yurgovuchia doellingi – type locality for species

Z

  †Zamites
 †Zamites powelli
 †Zamites tidwellii – type locality for species
 †Zygiocuspis – type locality for genus
 †Zygiocuspis goldingi – type locality for species
 †Zygopleura
 †Zygopleura haasi – type locality for species

References

 

Utah
Mesozoic
Mesozoic life